The 1993 Wisconsin Badgers football team represented the University of Wisconsin during the 1993 NCAA Division I-A football season. They were led by fourth year head coach Barry Alvarez and participated as members of the Big Ten Conference. The Badgers played their home games at Camp Randall Stadium in Madison, Wisconsin.

Season
Over the course of the season, Wisconsin was the top team in the Big Ten in terms of passing efficiency, with QB Darrell Bevell recording an impressive 155.2 in that category. RB Brent Moss ran for 1,637 yards on 312 carries, winning Big Ten Player of the Year Honors, the first Wisconsin player to receive this award since Ron Vander Kelen in the 1962 season.

After starting the season 3–0, including a win in their Big Ten opener against Indiana, team co-captain Joe Panos was asked by a reporter whether he thought Michigan or Ohio State would win the conference, to which Panos sharply responded, "Well, why not Wisconsin?" Panos' words served to inspire the team and the school, using the rally cry of "Why Not Wisconsin?" for the rest of the season.

The Badgers lost in a stunning upset to a mediocre Minnesota team in their annual rivalry game for their first and only loss of the season.  Footage from this game held at the Hubert H. Humphrey Metrodome was used in the television series Coach to represent the fictional Minnesota State and West Texas Universities in the "Pioneer Bowl" at the Alamodome.

However, in the next game, Wisconsin defeated Michigan for the first time since 1981. After a tie against Ohio State, the Badgers needed to win their final game of the year against Michigan State and an Ohio State loss to Michigan to secure their first trip to the Rose Bowl since 1963. Michigan's 28–0 shut out of Ohio State opened the door, and then Wisconsin defeated #25 Michigan State in the last Coca-Cola Classic in Tokyo, Japan to win a share of Big Ten Conference title and the invitation to the 1994 Rose Bowl.

The Badgers finished their most successful season since 1962, highlighted by their first Rose Bowl win, as they defeated the UCLA Bruins 21–16.  Unfortunately, the season is also remembered for the tragic "Camp Randall Crush" where several people were severely injured during a field rush after the Badgers defeated Michigan.

Individual awards and honors
Brent Moss, Big Ten Player of the Year
Barry Alvarez, Big Ten Coach of the Year

Schedule and results

Rankings

Roster

Regular starters

Game summaries

Nevada

at SMU

Iowa State

at Indiana

Northwestern

at Purdue

at Minnesota

Michigan

Ohio State

at Illinois

vs Michigan State

vs UCLA–Rose Bowl

Team players selected in the 1994 NFL Draft

References

Wisconsin
Big Ten Conference football champion seasons
Rose Bowl champion seasons
Wisconsin Badgers football seasons
Wisconsin Badgers football